Till There Was You is a 1990 Australian film directed by John Seale, written by Michael Thomas, and starring Mark Harmon, Martin Garner, Gregory T. Daniel, and Deborah Kara Unger. The film was shot on location in the South Pacific island nation of Vanuatu.

The film's title is taken from the song "Till There Was You", written by Meredith Willson for his 1957 musical play The Music Man. Australian pop singer Kate Ceberano performed the song on the movie's soundtrack.

Plot

Frank Flynn is summonsed from New York City to Vanuatu by his brother Charlie. He arrives only to find Charlie dead, and becomes involved with his late brother's partner, Viv, and Viv's unhappy wife, Anna.

Cast
Mark Harmon as Frank Flynn
Jeroen Krabbe as Robert 'Viv' Vivaldi
Deborah Unger as Anna Vivaldi
Martin Garner as Mr. Jimmy
Gregory Daniel as Trumpet Player
Terry Davis as Joanna
Pamela Kalsal as Stewardess 
Shane Briant as Rex
Lech Mackiewicz as Muzza
Ivan Kesa as Snowy
Ritchie Singer as Robbo
Jeff Truman as Nobby
Kate Ceberano as Jazz Singer

Production
According to producer Jim McElroy, the aim of the movie was to make an adventure film in the style of Elephant Walk (1954) or To Have and Have Not (1944). It marked the directorial debut of highly regarded cinematographer John Seale. Dennis Quaid was originally rumoured to play the lead.

Half the budget was provided by the FFC, whose contribution amounted to $6,326,711.

The film was shot from 6 November 1989 to 19 January 1990.

References

External links 

Till There Was You at the National Film and Sound Archive
Till There Was You at Peter Malone
Till There Was You at New York Times
Review at Entertainment Weekly
Till There Was You at TCMDB
Trailer at Artist Direct

1990 films
1990 drama films
American drama films
Australian drama films
Films scored by Graeme Revell
Films set in Vanuatu
Films shot in Vanuatu
1990s English-language films
1990s American films
1990s Australian films